Louisiana is a city in Pike County, Missouri, United States. The population was 3,364 at the 2010 census. Louisiana is located in northeast Missouri, on the Mississippi River, south of Hannibal.

Louisiana is located at the junction of State Route 79 and US 54. The former follows the Mississippi River for most of its length from Hannibal to St. Charles County. The latter enters Louisiana from Illinois via the Champ Clark Bridge, named for a former US Speaker of the House from nearby Bowling Green.

History

The town was founded in 1816 by John Walter Basye and named after his daughter, Louisiana Basye. Other notable early residents were Samuel Caldwell and Joel Shaw, both of whom purchased land from Basye in 1818. All three properties became the original town plat and comprised mainly riverfront properties. Many of the town's residents trace their ancestry to these town pioneers. Louisiana proved to be a profitable shipping point on the Mississippi River, and that wealth led to numerous substantial antebellum homes. Many of those still remain and, along with the Georgia Street Historic District in downtown Louisiana, are listed on the National Register of Historic Places. The Missouri Department of Natural Resources has noted that the town has "the most intact Victorian Streetscape in the state of Missouri."

Louisiana is one of three communities forming the 50 Miles of Art corridor, linked by history, heritage and Route 79; Louisiana, Clarksville and Hannibal are home to many artists, crafts-persons and artisans. The community is also home to the annual Louisiana Country Colorfest.

In 1946, the town was the site of a Fischer-Tropsch plant capable of producing liquid hydrocarbon fuels. Seven scientists brought into the United States by Operation Paperclip from Nazi Germany took part in the research.

Louisiana hopes to be part of the "green energy" revolution as a former ammonia plant has been converted for the study and production of synthetic fuels. The city is also the headquarters on Lens.com. 

Louisiana is home to Pike County's largest festival, the Louisiana Country Colorfest, that began in 1984. The event is held the third weekend in October and is attended by over 8,000 people annually.

In addition to the Georgia Street Historic District, the Charles Bacon House, Capt. George and Attella Barnard House, Bethel Chapel AME Church, City Market, Goodman-Stark House, Louisiana Chicago & Alton Railroad Depot, Louisiana Public Library, North Third Street Historic District, Pike County Hospital, and Gov. Lloyd Crow Stark House and Carriage House are listed on the National Register of Historic Places.

Geography
The city is in northern Pike County on the Mississippi River. The city is served by U.S. Route 54 and Missouri Route 79. Bowling Green lies about ten miles to the southwest on route 54 and the town of Pike, Illinois lies across the river to the northeast. Clarksville is about nine miles to the southeast along route 79.

Demographics

2010 census
As of the census of 2010, there were 3,364 people, 1,411 households, and 880 families living in the city. The racial makeup of the city was 89.9% White, 4.7% African American, 0.2% Native American, 0.3% Asian, 2.3% from other races, and 2.6% from two or more races. Hispanic or Latino of any race were 4.1% of the population.

There were 1,411 households, of which 29.8% had children under the age of 18 living with them, 42.0% were married couples living together, 14.1% had a female householder with no husband present, 6.3% had a male householder with no wife present, and 37.6% were non-families. 32.2% of all households were made up of individuals, and 16.2% had someone living alone who was 65 years of age or older. The average household size was 2.35 and the average family size was 2.91.

The median age in the city was 41.3 years. 24.3% of residents were under the age of 18; 7.6% were between the ages of 18 and 24; 22.2% were from 25 to 44; 25.8% were from 45 to 64; and 20.1% were 65 years of age or older. The gender makeup of the city was 47.4% male and 52.6% female.

2000 census
As of the census of 2000, there were 3,863 people, 1,590 households, and 1,006 families living in the city. The population density was 1,234.4 people per square mile (476.5/km2). There were 1,843 housing units at an average density of 588.9 per square mile (227.3/km2). The racial makeup of the city was 90.27% White, 5.72% African American, 0.36% Native American, 0.26% Asian, 0.13% Pacific Islander, 2.20% from other races, and 1.06% from two or more races. Hispanic or Latino of any race were 3.93% of the population.

There were 1,590 households, out of which 28.6% had children under the age of 18 living with them, 47.5% were married couples living together, 11.5% had a female householder with no husband present, and 36.7% were non-families. 32.6% of all households were made up of individuals, and 17.7% had someone living alone who was 65 years of age or older. The average household size was 2.35 and the average family size was 2.92.

In the city the population was spread out, with 24.4% under the age of 18, 7.6% from 18 to 24, 25.7% from 25 to 44, 20.8% from 45 to 64, and 21.5% who were 65 years of age or older. The median age was 40 years. For every 100 females, there were 89.2 males. For every 100 females age 18 and over, there were 86.0 males.

The median income for a household in the city was $30,467, and the median income for a family was $37,939. Males had a median income of $28,750 versus $19,167 for females. The per capita income for the city was $15,623. About 15.6% of families and 20.4% of the population were below the poverty line, including 30.7% of those under age 18 and 11.3% of those age 65 or over.

Education
Public education in Louisiana is administered by Louisiana R-II School District.

Louisiana has a lending library, the Louisiana Public Library.

Notable people
 Lloyd C. Stark, Governor of Missouri 1937–41, born in Louisiana, Mo.
 Eddie South,  World Famous Jazz Violinist, 1904–1962, born in Louisiana, Mo.
 George Samuel Clason, Author, who wrote the popular book "The Richest Man in Babylon" born in Louisiana, MO.

See also
 Momo the Monster
 Synthetic Liquid Fuels Program

References

External links

 Louisiana, Missouri official website
 Historic maps of Louisiana in the Sanborn Maps of Missouri Collection at the University of Missouri

Cities in Pike County, Missouri
Missouri populated places on the Mississippi River
1816 establishments in Missouri Territory
Cities in Missouri
Populated places established in 1816